Darreh Garm or Darreh-ye Garm or Darrehgarm may refer to:
Darreh Garm, Fars
Darreh-ye Garm, Khuzestan
Darreh Garm, Kohgiluyeh and Boyer-Ahmad
Darreh Garm, Borujerd, Lorestan Province
Darreh Garm, Khorramabad, Lorestan Province
Darreh Garm, Markazi
Darreh Garm, Sistan and Baluchestan

See also
Garm Darreh